Pether Markne (born 27 July 1962) is a Swedish equestrian. He competed in two events at the 2000 Summer Olympics.

References

External links
 

1962 births
Living people
Swedish male equestrians
Swedish dressage riders
Olympic equestrians of Sweden
Equestrians at the 2000 Summer Olympics
Sportspeople from Stockholm